Fran Lhotka (25 December 1883 – 26 January 1962) was a Czech-born Croatian composer of classical music.

A student of Antonín Dvořák, in 1909 he moved to Zagreb where as a professor of harmony he would teach almost every Croatian contemporary composer. He composed orchestral music, music for the stage, chamber music, piano music, film music etc.

Biography

Fran Lhotka was born on 25 December 1883 in the town of Mladá Vožice in Bohemia. In 1899 he became a student of the Prague Conservatory, studying horn and composition; he was taught composition by Karel Stecker, Josef Klička and Antonín Dvořák. Six years later he graduated in both courses; the graduation piece in composition was the “Rej” Scherzo in F Major, performed for the first time in the Musikverein Hall in Vienna. After he had done his military service, and worked for a short time as a teacher in a branch of the Moscow conservatory in Yekaterinoslav (today Dnepropetrovsk, Ukraine, once part of the Russian Empire), he arrived in Zagreb, in 1909, and accepted the job of first hornist and rehearsal pianist in the Opera. The increasingly better organisation of the concert scene and the reform of musical education made Zagreb an apt place for young composers to make a name for themselves. They arrived (mostly returning) from their training in Vienna, Prague, Budapest, Berlin and Paris, and in 1910 Lhotka was a teacher in the Music School of the Croatian Land Music Institute, later to be the Music Academy.

In 1912 he left the Opera, and devoted himself full-time to teaching and to composition. He worked as a teacher until the end of his life (he died on 26 January 1962 in Zagreb), with a break for World War II, when he went into retirement. Showing himself an all-round, talented and competent musician, along with the harmony that he taught the longest – forty years – in different periods he also taught horn, conducting, music theory, instrumentation, composition, orchestral score analysis and history of music. His lectures were attended by some of the most important Croatian composers and musicians of the future period - Ivo Brkanović, Bruno Bjelinski, Krešimir Kovačević, Stjepan Šulek and Slavko Zlatić. In addition, as conductor, from 1913 to 1921 he led the Lisinski Singing Association, greatly changing and improving on the previous choral practice, for which he won the title of “pioneer of high quality choral singing in the country”.  He also conducted the orchestra of the Music Academy (1922 – 1941) and for a short time the choir too, regularly winning lauds in Zagreb and in guest appearances, particularly for his championing of the performance of works by domestic composers, but also for the presentation of the masterpieces of the world repertoire. For some time he ran the Community Orchestra of the Croatian Music Institute (1923 – 1930) and occasionally conducted the Zagreb Philharmonic Orchestra. He proved his worth as an organiser and manager. He had administrative duties at the Academy, twice being dean, for a total of twenty years. In addition, he played an important role in its attaining the status of a tertiary level institution, and is to be credited with the beginning of the work of the City Music School in Zagreb – now the Pavao Markovac Music School. Lhotka complemented his teaching work with valuable manuals on conducting (1931) and harmony (1948), and of course as composer made his mark on the training of new generations of musicians, writing a number of piano and orchestral works for children and young adults.

Fran Lhotka died in Zagreb on 26 January 1962.

He had three sons, Ivo Lhotka-Kalinski (1913–1987), also a composer; Nenad Lhotka, a ballet dancer/ballet master of the Royal Winnipeg Ballet (married to Alis Jill Morse); and Sasha Lhotka.

Oeuvre

Well-appreciated as a teacher, Fran Lhotka soon stood out for his compositions as well. He arrived in Zagreb when the European music of transition of the first two decades of the 20th century was in full swing. The oeuvres of Dora Pejačević, Josip Hatze and Blagoje Bersa were part of the new profiling of Croatian modernism. Lhotka found himself in the midst of the revolutionary Western European novelties and freedoms typified by the works of Arnold Schönberg, Igor Stravinsky, Anton Webern, Béla Bartók and Alexander Scriabin and of the increasing dominance of the “national course” in music. At the time when writing in the spirit of folk music confirmed that a composer belonged to a national culture, and was committed to its development, Lhotka found himself inspired by the folk music of this country, gracefully incorporating it into his compositional principles, which had developed out of the best Czech tradition. As well as choral works and arrangements of folk songs that he wrote almost entirely for the needs of performing practice, arrangements of works of other composers, solo songs, cantatas and chamber music, it seems that he was most attracted by orchestral, and even more by stage, music. His works for orchestra, his two operas (Minka and More / The Sea), his film music (documentaries and features, among which the last was Svoga tela gospodar / Master of his Own Body), and a number of ballet works were the mainstay of his creative work. He achieved particular successes with ballets created in association with Pia and Pino Mlakar, both of them dancers and choreographers. With them he produced Đavo u selu, balada o jednoj srednjovjekovnoj ljubavi / Devil in the Village, Ballad of a Middle Aged Love and The Bow. In fact, Devil in the Village was so omnipresent on the stage that it seemed to epitomise the Croatian ballet. After it was first performed in 1935 in the City Theatre in Zurich, the media wrote of “a real celebration”, ”an outstanding success”, “great charm” and “virtuoso use of orchestration” . It had equal success when it was first performed in Zagreb on 3 April 1937. How successful it was can be seen from further performances Europe-wide: Karlsruhe, Prague, Munich, Hamburg, Berlin, Frankfurt, Dresden, Vienna, Genoa, Sofia, Athens and Salzburg. Lhotka's masterfully orchestrated score was often praised as a complete achievement on its own, just as impressive without the visual stimulus (in 1939 Lhotka made two orchestral suites from the ballet, as he did from other stage music of his). It is not surprising then that most of his music remained in the shadow of Devil in the Village.

Works (selection)

A very few of his many works include:
 Violin Concerto 
 Piano Concerto 
 Symphony 
 String quartet in G minor (1911)
 The Devil in the Village (ballet in 8 scenes) (by 1935)
 Film People Will Survive  (1947)(Zivjece ovaj narod)
 Concerto for Strings (by 1957)
 Frescoes, Three Symphonic Movements (1957)
 Film The Master of his Own Body (1957)(Svoga tela gospodar)
 Sljepačka for viola and piano (1960)
 Serenade for two flutes, clarinet and piano

References

External links 
 
 

1883 births
1962 deaths
20th-century classical composers
Croatian composers
Czech composers
Czech male composers
Male film score composers
Croatian film score composers
Czech film score composers
Croatian people of Czech descent
People from the Kingdom of Bohemia
People from Mladá Vožice
Burials at Mirogoj Cemetery
20th-century Czech male musicians